Interactive Energy AG is an energy and commodities company. Physical trading, logistics and distribution are at the core of the business, but these are complemented by refining, shipping, terminals exploration and production, power generation, and mining business solutions.

The company trades in and distributes physical commodities sourced from third party producers. They also provide, processing, storage, logistics and other services to commodity producers and consumers. Their customer base is highly diversified, with a high proportion of long-term commercial relationships. The business model of the company covers a wide range of products, activities and locations.

Furthermore, they offer their customers the option of registering and trading with an Interactive Energy application, which can be used by clients on their mobile or on tablets. The application also provides real-time pricing, market data and news, along with a full history of their transactions, P&L information and an integrated tracking system allowing the user to monitor the shipment of the physical commodity.

Founded in Switzerland in 2015, the company has offices in Lucerne, London, and Hong Kong.

History
Interactive Energy AG is a joint stock corporation, which is completely financed by Ruben Katsobashvili, who has been active in different commodity sectors, notably in the petroleum industry in Russia.

Katsobashvili is a Russian investor who lives in Moscow. He made his fortune with the Ben brothers in Telecoms, one of the strongest wholesalers in Europe.

The Director of Interactive Energy AG is Jose Luis Fernandez, who was born on 15 March 1961. He is the current Group Director, a position he has held since May 2015.

Legal legislative principles and texts
The company is a trusted organization that follows the legal responsibilities of EU Law and is compliant with the relevant national and EU legislative texts for different resources like Electricity, Natural Gas and Energy Efficiency.

The relevant EU legislative texts are laws at both EU and federal level, including acts, orders, ordinances, directives or decisions by the European Commission.

Interactive Energy AG has earned the Energy Efficiency Certificate for being  Neutral and the company also has a certificate for achieving balance by engaging in  reducing projects.

Operations
As of 1 June 2015, the company structure and its services have been categorized into different major Sectors and five Selling and Market Organizations (SMOs)

Sectors

 Agricultural Products
 Alumina
 Carbon Emissions
 Chemicals
 Coal 
 Crude Oil 
 Ethanol
 Fuel Oil 
 Gasoline
 Iron Ore
 LNG
 LPG
 Methanol
 Middle Distillates
 Naphtha
 Natural Gas
 Oil Production & Demand
 Power 
 Soft Commodities 
 Sugar

SMOs 

Corporate Headquarters

Lucerne

Switzerland

Others

London, UK

Europe

North and South America

Hong Kong

Far East

Major producers 

 Russia
 Colombia
 United States
 South Africa
 Indonesia
 Australia

Future Functional Areas

 Beijing
 Singapore
 Mumbai
 EU

Management and staff
The board of directors of Interactive Energy AG includes Ruben Katsobashvili and Jose Luis Aneas Fernandez and consists of the chairman, the CEO and a number of non-Executive directors.

The board manages the sales, logistics, trading, origination and operation activities for all kinds of trading and financial projects from all over the world majorly in the European countries.

Major functions
The business has major activities which include physical trading, marketing and logistics as well as risk advisory services.

Online market data
The company displays regular and updated online data entries for trading to help investors make decisions according to the market environment.

References

External links
 

Energy markets
Oil traders
Energy companies of Switzerland
Electric power companies of Switzerland
Oil and gas companies of Switzerland
Privately held companies of Switzerland
Swiss companies established in 2015
Non-renewable resource companies established in 2015